Raasiku is a borough in Raasiku Parish, Harju County, Estonia, with a population of 1,372 (2020). Although situated in a parish with the same name, Raasiku is not the official administrative centre of the municipality (which is Aruküla, located some kilometres or one railway station closer to Tallinn). The settlement started to grow in the 19th century around the railway station. The Raasiku manor (first mentioned in 1497) was established on the grounds of the earlier Kaemla (Keamol) village and in the middle ages it belonged to Padise Abbey.

There is a primary school (since 1717), community centre, library, health care centre, pharmacy, kindergarten and three grocery stores in Raasiku. Also, some industrial manufacturers operate there: AS Mistra-Autex produces car carpets and wall finishing materials; AS Raasiku Elekter makes electrical equipment and metal products.

Harju-Jaani John the Baptist Lutheran Church is in Raasiku. The current church building was built in 1863, but there are preserved foundations of the old chapel. There is the churchyard, the old and the new cemetery and a manor park.

Transport

Raasiku is split by the Tallinn-Tapa railway. The railway station was opened in 1870. In Soviet times a building for the goods station and signalling control was built. The old wooden passenger station was demolished in 2000, but the ancillary buildings and water tower have been preserved. All suburban trains stop there and also trains heading in the direction of Tartu and Narva (except for express trains). A ride to Tallinn takes about 35 minutes (30 minutes with the express suburban train).

Raasiku also has a bus connection to Tallinn (generally much slower than the train due to the length of the lines and a large number of stops). There are four bus stops in Raasiku.

The Jägala–Aruvalla road passes through Raasiku and local roads to Kostivere, Kehra, Anija and Aruaru emerge from it.

Sports
There's a football club Raasiku FC Joker based in Raasiku, currently playing in the Estonian fourth division II liiga.
2018 opened Raasiku Sports Centre, located Kooli 1

Notable people
Tõnu Õim (born 1941), the double world champion of correspondence chess, was born in Raasiku.

References

Boroughs and small boroughs in Estonia
Kreis Harrien
Holocaust locations in Estonia

de:Raasiku